Thomas Tataranowicz is an American cartoon animator, storyboard artist, producer and director.

Career
His first credit was He-Man and the Masters of the Universe. He then went onto Marvel Productions/New World Animation where he was the Studio Head, Creative Executive Producer and Head of Development and Production of all series. These include franchises such as Biker Mice from Mars, Iron Man, Fantastic Four, and The Incredible Hulk.

Since 1999, Tom has operated his own animation studio, Tom T. Animation, Inc. He later formed Gang of 7 Animation in 2001.

Filmography
Source:

References

External links
 
 G7 Animation profile

Year of birth missing (living people)
Wayne State University alumni
Living people
Artists from Detroit
Animators from Michigan
American storyboard artists
American television directors
American television producers
American television writers
American animated film directors
American male television writers
American voice directors
Screenwriters from Michigan